Eugene Leon Caton (October 13, 1889 – March 12, 1979) was an American college football player and coach as well as an oil salesman.

Early years
Eugene Leon Caton was born on October 13, 1889 in Covington County, Alabama to Noah Dent Caton and Elizabeth Rousseau.

Playing career

Auburn
He was a center for the Auburn Tigers of Auburn University. John Heisman considered him one of the south's greatest centers. He was selected All-Southern in 1910. Eugene was the older brother of Noah Caton. He was 171 pounds.

Coaching career

Howard
Caton coached the Howard Bulldogs in 1915.

Oil salesman
Caton managed the southern branch of the Pure Oil company in 1922, which marketed Tiolene, Pennsylvania base motor oil.

Head coaching record

Football

References

1889 births
1979 deaths
American football centers
Auburn Tigers football players
Samford Bulldogs athletic directors
Samford Bulldogs baseball coaches
Samford Bulldogs football coaches
All-Southern college football players
People from Covington County, Alabama
Players of American football from Alabama